Carmel Cryan (born 8 July 1949) is an English actress, known for the role of Brenda Boyle in the BBC soap opera EastEnders. She was the wife of the actor Roy Kinnear (1934–1988).

Life and career
Cryan was born in London. She was married to the actor Roy Kinnear until his death in 1988. They had three children together, including Rory Kinnear, who is also an actor; and Kirsty, who works as a casting assistant. The couple's elder daughter, Karina (1972–2020), who was born quadriplegic and had learning difficulties, died from COVID-19. In May 2014 Cryan was appointed as a trustee to Choice Support, a charitable trust that provides care to disabled people and people with learning disabilities.

In June 2008, she was cast as Brenda Boyle in EastEnders, a love interest for Charlie Slater (actor Derek Martin). She signed a six-month contract in August 2008. Cryan was written out of EastEnders in August 2009 when Brenda emigrated to Madeira with Charlie.

Acting roles

References

External links
 

1949 births
Living people
English television actresses
Actresses from London